(born September 16, 1974) is a retired Japanese male breaststroke swimmer. He represented Japan at three consecutive Summer Olympics, starting in 1992. He is best known for winning a five medals in the 1990s at the Summer Universiade.

References
 

1974 births
Living people
Olympic swimmers of Japan
Swimmers at the 1992 Summer Olympics
Swimmers at the 1996 Summer Olympics
Swimmers at the 2000 Summer Olympics
People from Miyazaki Prefecture
Asian Games medalists in swimming
Asian Games gold medalists for Japan
Asian Games silver medalists for Japan
Japanese male breaststroke swimmers
Medalists at the 1994 Asian Games
Medalists at the 1998 Asian Games
Swimmers at the 1994 Asian Games
Swimmers at the 1998 Asian Games
Universiade medalists in swimming
Universiade gold medalists for Japan
Universiade silver medalists for Japan
Universiade bronze medalists for Japan
Medalists at the 1995 Summer Universiade
Medalists at the 1999 Summer Universiade
20th-century Japanese people
21st-century Japanese people